The Royal House of Boureh Gnilane Joof (variation : Mbin Boureh Gnilane or Mbind Bure Nilaan in Serer) was a royal house founded in the 14th century by Jaraff Boureh Gnilane Joof (var : Bouré Gnilane Diouf or Buré Ñilaan). He was a member the Serer tribe, from the pre-colonial Kingdom of Sine now part of independent Senegal. It was the first royal house founded by the Joof family during the Guelowar period (1350 - 1969). Boureh Gnilane Joof was a royal prince and a Jaraff (var : Diaraf), a Serer title of nobility with the powers of a prime minister. He was neither a Maad a Sinig (king of Sine) nor a Maad Saloum (king of Saloum) but a royal prince who had the title Jaraff bestowed upon him by his cousin and brother-in-law - Maad a Sinig Diessanou Faye (king of Sine). His father Maad Patar Kholleh Joof (the conqueror) was the king of Laa and Teigne of Baol (king of Baol).  Boureh's brothers were the first from this house to have succeeded to the throne of Sine during the Guelowar period. His name was adopted in his honour to refer to the first royal house founded by the Joof family during this dynastic period. The Joof family of Sine, from this royal house also ruled in the Kingdom of Saloum (the Joof paternal dynasty of Sine and Saloum) The Joof family also ruled in Baol (the Joof paternal dynasty of Baol). From the date of its foundation up to the abolition of the Serer monarchies of Sine and Saloum in 1969, at least ten kings from this house had succeeded to the throne of Sine. As the first royal house of Sine founded by the Joof family in this dynastic period, the Royal House of Boureh Gnilane Joof holds great significance in Senegambian, Joof family and Serer history, because all the subsequent royal houses founded by the Joof family (who ruled in three Senegambian kingdoms) branched out from this royal house.

List of kings
The following is a list of kings from the Royal House of Boureh Gnilane Joof that reigned in the Serer kingdoms of Sine and Saloum.  Their royal titles :  Maad a Sinig and Maad Saloum signifies king of Sine and Saloum respectively. The surname Joof is the English spelling in the Gambia, whilst Diouf is the French spelling in Senegal. The proper spelling is Juuf or Juf in Serer which reflects the actual pronunciation (see Joof family) :

Kingdom of Sine
 Maad a Sinig Niokhobai Mane Nyan Joof, brother of Boureh Gnilane and the first Maad a Sinig (king of Sine) from this royal house. Reigned : c. 1369 - 1379
 Maad a Sinig Gejopal Mane Nyan Joof, brother of Boureh Gnilane and Maad a Sinig Niokhobai Mane Nyan Joof. Reigned : c. 1379 - 1394 During his reign, his reign, the Kingdom of Sine underwent a religious reformation  (the religious reformation of Maad a Sinig Gejopal Mane Nyan Joof)<ref>Gravrand, Henry, "La civilisation Sereer, vol. 2. Pangool, Les Nouvelles Editions Africaines du Sénégal (1990), pp 32-33, </ref>
 Maad a Sinig Ama Kodu Joof, reigned : c. 1516 - 1534.
 Maad a Sinig Latsouk Gnilane Samba Joof, reigned : c. 1672 - 1688. During his reign, the Serer priestly class (the Saltigues) were public humiliated if the actual event differs from what they had divined at the Xooy ceremony (var : Khoy). 
 Maad a Sinig Ama Kodu Samba Joof, reigned : c. 1715 -1724. He aided the Damel of Cayor at the Battle of Sanghai and defeated the Teigne of Baol.
 Maad a Sinig Boukar Tjilas Mahe Soum Joof, reigned : 1750 - 1763. He was the father of Lingeer Kodu Kumba Yandeh Mbarou Joof (many variations : Codou Coumba Yandé) the princess of Sine and queen mother of Cayor and Baol. Lingeer Kodu Kumba Yandeh Mbarou was the mother of Damel-Teigne Makodu Yandeh Mbarou Joof Faal (var : Macodou Codou Coumba Yandé), the king of Cayor and Baol (see Guelowar). 
 Maad a Sinig Ama Kodu Mahe Ngom Joof, reigned 1770 - 1789. As well as chairing the meetings of the Saltigues during his reign, he also challenged their authority. Apart from his interference in religious matters, the Kingdom of Sine was very peaceful during his reign.
 Maad a Sinig Jaligue Sira Joof, reigned : 1885 - 1886Diouf, Niokhobaye, "Chronique du royaume du Sine", (1972), p 731 (p 19) He came to the throne following a civil war brought on by the dynastic struggles of Maad a Sinig Amadi Baro Joof and Maad a Sinig Mbackeh Mak Njie. He died few months after succeeding to the throne. After his death, the Junjung of Sine was recovered from his estate and kept by his successor and former adversary (Maad a Sinig Mbackeh Mak).
Maad a Sinig Niokhobai Semou Joof, reigned 1886 - 1887
Maad a Sinig Kumba Ndoffene Fa Ndeb Joof. He was the last Serer king of Sine from this royal house. He died from illness in 1923.

Kingdom of Saloum
 Maad Saloum Malawtan Joof, originally from Sine. He was the longest reigning king of Saloum (45 years on the throne) and one of the most well known. Reigned : 1567 - 1612.
 Maad Saloum Ama-Joof Joof. His father came from Sine. On his maternal line, he was a Guelowar from the royal line of Lingeer Begay Souka (var : Bigué Souka). Reigned : 1690 - 1696 Like Malawtan Joof, many of his descendants that ruled Saloum partains to this royal house.

See also
The Royal House of Jogo Siga Joof
The Royal House of Semou Njekeh Joof
Kingdom of Sine
Serer people
Joof family
Kingdom of Saloum
Kingdom of Baol
Joos Maternal Dynasty

Notes

Bibliography
 Diouf, Niokhobaye, "Chronique du royaume du Sine", Suivie de notes sur les traditions orales et les sources écrites concernant le royaume du Sine par Charles Becker et Victor Martin. (1972). Bulletin de l'Ifan, Tome 34, Série B, n° 4, (1972).La famille Juuf [in] « L'épopée de Sanmoon Fay », [in] Éthiopiques, no 54, vol. 7, 2e semestre 1991 
 Sarr, Alioune, "Histoire du Sine-Saloum" (Sénégal). Introduction, bibliographie et notes par Charles Becker. Version légèrement remaniée par rapport à celle qui est parue en 1986-87 (extract)
 Klein, Martin. A., "Islam and Imperialism in Senegal Sine-Saloum, 1847-1914", Edinburgh University Press (1968), 
Institut fondamental d'Afrique noire, "Bulletin de l'Institut fondamental d'Afrique noire: Sciences humaines, Volume 46", IFAN (1985), p 232
Gravrand, Henry, "La civilisation Sereer, vol. 2. Pangool, Les Nouvelles Editions Africaines du Sénégal (1990), 
Phillips, Lucie Colvin, Historical dictionary of Senegal, Scarecrow Press (1981), pp 52-71 
Institut fondamental d'Afrique noire, Bulletin de l'Institut fondamental d'Afrique noire, Volume 38. IFAN (1976), pp 557-504
List of kings of Saloum by king « Fodé Diouf » [in] Brigaud, Félix, "Histoire traditionnelle du Sénégal", Études sénégalaises, n° 9, St-Louis, CRDS, (1962), pp 161–162
Ba, Abdou Bouri, "Essai sur l’histoire du Saloum et du Rip". Avant-propos par Charles Becker et Victor Martin, BIFAN, Tome 38, Série B, n° 4, octobre (1976)
"Notes africaines, Issues 145-156", Institut fondamental d'Afrique noire, Institut français d'Afrique noire, (1975), p 111

External linksLa famille Juuf [in] « L'épopée de Sanmoon Fay », [in] Éthiopiques, no 54, vol. 7, 2e semestre 1991 
Sarr, Alioune, "Histoire du Sine-Saloum"'' (Sénégal). Introduction, bibliographie et notes par Charles Becker. Version légèrement remaniée par rapport à celle qui est parue en 1986-87 (extract)
Alioune Sarr, "Histoire du Sine-Saloum" [in] Omar Diaw, "Sénégal: Diakhao - Dans la cour des Bour Sine" (27 Mars 2012) [in] All Africa  (regarding Serer royalty of Sine)

Serer royalty